The Sea View League, along with the South Coast League in Orange County, California, make up the nine member high schools of the Coast View Athletic Association, which is part of the California Interscholastic Federation's Southern Section.

For the 2018–19 academic year, the member schools of the Sea View League are:

 Baseball
 Aliso Niguel
 Laguna Hills
 San Clemente
 San Juan Hills
 Trabuco Hills
 Basketball, Boys
 Dana Hills
 El Toro
 Laguna Hills
 San Juan Hills
 Tesoro
 Basketball, Girls
 Capistrano Valley
 El Toro
 Laguna Hills
 Mission Viejo
 San Juan Hills
 Cross Country, Boys
 Capistrano Valley
 Laguna Hills
 San Clemente
 Tesoro
 Trabuco Hills
 Cross Country, Girls
 Aliso Niguel
 Laguna Hills
 San Clemente
 San Juan Hills
 Tesoro
 Football (11 man)
 Aliso Niguel
 Dana Hills
 Capistrano Valley
 El Toro
 Trabuco Hills
 Golf, Boys
 Aliso Niguel
 El Toro
 Laguna Hills
 San Juan Hills
 Trabuco Hills
 Golf, Girls
 Capistrano Valley
 El Toro
 Laguna Hills
 Mission Viejo
 Tesoro
 Lacrosse, Boys
 Aliso Niguel
 Dana Hills
 Laguna Hills
 San Juan Hills
 Lacrosse, Girls
 Capistrano Valley
 Dana Hills
 El Toro
 Laguna Hills
 Mission Viejo
 Soccer, Boys
 Aliso Niguel
 Dana Hills
 Laguna Hills
 Tesoro
 Trabuco Hills
 Soccer, Girls
 Capistrano Valley
 El Toro
 Laguna Hills
 Mission Viejo
 Trabuco Hills
 Softball
 Capistrano Valley
 El Toro
 San Clemente
 Tesoro
 Trabuco Hills
 Swimming & Diving, Boys
 Capistrano Valley
 El Toro
 Mission Viejo
 San Juan Hills
 Trabuco Hills
 Swimming & Diving, Girls
 Capistrano Valley
 El Toro
 Mission Viejo
 San Juan Hills
 Trabuco Hills
 Tennis, Boys
 Capistrano Valley
 Laguna Hills
 Mission Viejo
 San Juan Hills
 Trabuco Hills
 Tennis, Girls
 El Toro
 Laguna Hills
 Mission Viejo
 San Juan Hills
 Trabuco Hills
 Track & Field, Boys
 Capistrano Valley
 Laguna Hills
 San Clemente
 San Juan Hills
 Tesoro
 Track & Field, Girls
 Capistrano Valley
 Laguna Hills
 San Clemente
 San Juan Hills
 Tesoro
 Volleyball, Boys
 Capistrano Valley
 El Toro
 Laguna Hills
 Mission Viejo
 San Juan Hills
 Volleyball, Girls
 Capistrano Valley
 Laguna Hills
 Mission Viejo
 San Clemente
 Tesoro
 Water Polo, Boys
 Aliso Niguel
 Capistrano Valley
 Laguna Hills
 Mission Viejo
 Trabuco Hills
 Water Polo, Girls
 Capistrano Valley
 Laguna Hills
 Mission Viejo
 San Juan Hills
 Trabuco Hills
 Wrestling
 Capistrano Valley
 Mission Viejo
 San Clemente
 Tesoro
 Wrestling, Girls
 Capistrano Valley
 Mission Viejo
 San Clemente
 Tesoro

Football 
As of 2022-23, the football membership of the league consists of:
Aliso Niguel High School
El Toro High School
San Juan Hills High School	
Trabuco Hills High School

Athletic league officers 
The Sea View League is an athletic conference made up of similar schools located in Orange County, California.
President: Terri Gusiff, Principal, El Toro High School
Secretary: Teri Durst, Secretary, El Toro High School
League Compliance Officer: Chad Addison, athletic director, Capistrano Valley High School
League Coordinator: Armando Rivas, athletic director, El Toro High School
Counsel Representative: Craig Collins, Principal, Trabuco Hills High School

References

External links
CIF Southern Section Website

Sports in Orange County, California
CIF Southern Section leagues